Glorious New Zealand is a 1925 New Zealand documentary film directed by Arthur Messenger.
It was billed as “the most beautiful N.Z. picture ever”.

Production
This film was produced by Arthur Messenger for the New Zealand Government Publicity Office.

References

1925 films
1920s New Zealand films
Films shot in New Zealand
New Zealand documentary films
New Zealand silent films
New Zealand short films